The Special Crime Unit (Danish: National enhed for Særlig Kriminalitet (NSK)) is a unit that is part of the Danish police.

The unit works with investigation and prosecution of organized crime, financial crime and cybercrime. It is organized as a nationwide police district and consists of a police division, prosecution division, administration division and a money laundering secretariat.

History 

In 2020 the Danish Minister for Justice, Nick Hækkerup, announced plans to create a national police unit that could handle the most complicated types of crime and said he "dreamed of a Danish version of the FBI."

The Special Crime Unit opened 1 January 2022 and is a merger of Special Investigation West, Special Investigation East, the Nationwide Center for IT-related Economic Crime, the Border Center Øresund, the National Forensic Science Center, the National Cyber Crime Center as well as parts of the National Investigation Center and the Public Prosecutor for Economic and International Crime.

References

External links 
 Official website

Law enforcement agencies of Denmark